Henry Atherton may refer to:

 Henry B. Atherton (1835–1906), US Civil War veteran, and lawyer
Henry F. Atherton (1883–1949), American business executive, and lawyer
 Henry L. Atherton (1815–1896), American businessman and diplomat 
 Henry Valpey Atherton (1911–1967), American lawyer, part of the Nuremberg Trials
 Henry Vernon Atherton (1923–2016), American professor, and pioneer in the dairy industry

See also
 Henry Atherton Frost (1883–1952), American architect